was a  of the Imperial Japanese Navy.

Design
Tachibana and her sister ship  were at first planned to be large ocean-going vessels however due to financial problems they were redesigned to a smaller type. Unlike the preceding , which was powered by Parsons turbines, Sakura and Tachibana were installed with Kanpon vertical expansion engines.

Service
The ship, built at the Maizuru Naval Arsenal, was launched and completed in 1912, and entered service shortly afterward. After 20 years of service, Tachibana was decommissioned in 1932 and scrapped in 1933.

References

 Conway's All the World's Fighting Ships 1922–1946

Sakura-class destroyers
1912 ships
Ships built by Maizuru Naval Arsenal